Mum is a British television sitcom created and written by Stefan Golaszewski and starring Lesley Manville. It premiered on BBC Two on 13 May 2016 and concluded after three series, on 19 June 2019.

Series overview

Series 1 (2016)

Series 2 (2018)

Series 3 (2019)

References

See also
 https://www.comedy.co.uk/tv/mum/episodes/

Lists of British comedy television series episodes